Dung beetles are beetles that feed on feces. Some species of dung beetles can bury dung 250 times their own mass in one night.

Many dung beetles, known as rollers, roll dung into round balls, which are used as a food source or breeding chambers. Others, known as tunnelers, bury the dung wherever they find it. A third group, the dwellers, neither roll nor burrow: they simply live in dung. They are often attracted by the feces collected by burrowing owls. There are dung beetle species of various colors and sizes, and some functional traits such as body mass (or biomass) and leg length can have high levels of variability.

All the species belong to the superfamily Scarabaeoidea, most of them to the subfamilies Scarabaeinae and Aphodiinae of the family Scarabaeidae (scarab beetles). As most species of Scarabaeinae feed exclusively on feces, that subfamily is often dubbed true dung beetles. There are dung-feeding beetles which belong to other families, such as the Geotrupidae (the earth-boring dung beetle). The Scarabaeinae alone comprises more than 5,000 species.

The nocturnal African dung beetle Scarabaeus satyrus is one of the few known invertebrate animals that navigate and orient themselves using the Milky Way.

Taxonomy
Dung beetles are not a single taxonomic group; dung feeding is found in a number of families of beetles, so the behaviour cannot be assumed to have evolved only once.
 Coleoptera (order), beetles
 Scarabaeoidea (superfamily), scarabs (most families in the group do not use dung)
 Geotrupidae (family), "earth-boring dung beetles"
 Scarabaeidae (family), "scarab beetles" (not all species use dung)
 Scarabaeinae (subfamily), "true dung beetles"
 Aphodiinae (subfamily), "small dung beetles" (not all species use dung)

Ecology and behavior

Dung beetles live in many habitats, including desert, grasslands and savannas, farmlands, and native and planted forests. They are highly influenced by the environmental context, and do not prefer extremely cold or dry weather. They are found on all continents except Antarctica. They eat the dung of herbivores and omnivores, and prefer that produced by the latter. Many of them also feed on mushrooms and decaying leaves and fruits. One type living in Central America, Deltochilum valgum, is a carnivore preying upon millipedes. Another species from Mexico, Canthon virens preys on queen of leaf cutter ants Dung beetles do not necessarily have to eat or drink anything else, because the dung provides all the necessary nutrients.

Most dung beetles search for dung using their sensitive sense of smell. Some smaller species simply attach themselves to the dung-providers to wait for the dung. After capturing the dung, a dung beetle rolls it, following a straight line despite all obstacles. Sometimes, dung beetles try to steal the dung ball from another beetle, so the dung beetles have to move rapidly away from a dung pile once they have rolled their ball to prevent it from being stolen. Dung beetles can roll up to 10 times their weight. Male Onthophagus taurus beetles can pull 1,141 times their own body weight: the equivalent of an average person pulling six double-decker buses full of people.

A species of dung beetle (the African Scarabaeus zambesianus) navigates by polarization patterns in moonlight,  the first animal known to do so. Dung beetles can also navigate when only the Milky Way or clusters of bright stars are visible,  making them the only insects known to orient themselves by the Milky Way. The eyes of dung beetles are superposition compound eyes typical of many scarabaeid beetles;
The sequence of images shows a sequence of the beetle rolling a dung ball. It does this to navigate.

Cambefort and Hanski (1991) classified dung beetles into three functional types based on their feeding and nesting strategies such as – Rollers, Tunnelers and Dwellers. The "rollers" roll and bury a dung ball either for food storage or for making a brooding ball. In the latter case, two beetles, one male and one female, stay around the dung ball during the rolling process. Usually it is the male that rolls the ball, while the female hitch-hikes or simply follows behind. In some cases, the male and the female roll together. When a spot with soft soil is found, they stop and bury the  ball, then mate underground. After the mating, one or both of them prepares the brooding ball. When the ball is finished, the female lays eggs inside it, a form of mass provisioning.

Some species do not leave after this stage, but remain to safeguard their offspring. The dung beetle goes through a complete metamorphosis. The larvae live in brood balls made with dung prepared by their parents. During the larval stage, the beetle feeds on the dung surrounding it.

The behavior of the beetles was poorly understood until the studies of Jean Henri Fabre in the late 19th century. For example, Fabre corrected the myth that a dung beetle would seek aid from other dung beetles when confronted by obstacles. By observation and experiment, he found the seeming helpers were in fact awaiting an opportunity to steal the roller's food source.

They are widely used in ecological research as a good bioindicator group to examine the impacts of climate disturbances, such as extreme droughts  and associated fires, and human activities on tropical biodiversity  and ecosystem functioning, such as seed dispersal, soil bioturbation and nutrient cycling.

Benefits and uses

Dung beetles play a role in agriculture and tropical forests. By burying and consuming dung, they improve nutrient recycling and soil structure. Dung beetles have been further shown to improve soil conditions and plant growth on rehabilitated coal mines in South Africa. They are also important for the dispersal of seeds present in animals' dung, influencing seed burial and seedling recruitment in tropical forests. They can protect livestock, such as cattle, by removing the dung which, if left, could provide habitat for pests such as flies. Therefore, many countries have introduced the creatures for the benefit of animal husbandry. The American Institute of Biological Sciences reports that dung beetles save the United States cattle industry an estimated US$380 million annually through burying above-ground livestock feces.

In Australia, the Commonwealth Scientific and Industrial Research Organisation (CSIRO) commissioned the Australian Dung Beetle Project (1965–1985) which, led by George Bornemissza, sought to introduce species of dung beetles from South Africa and Europe. The successful introduction of 23 species was made, most notably Digitonthophagus gazella and Euoniticellus intermedius, which has resulted in improvement of the quality and fertility of Australian cattle pastures, along with a reduction in the population of pestilent Australian bush flies by around 90%. In 1995 it was reported that dung beetles were being trialled in the Sydney beach suburb of Curl Curl to deal with dog droppings.

An application has been made by Landcare Research to import up to 11 species of dung beetle into New Zealand. As well as improving pasture soils the Dung Beetle Release Strategy Group say that it would result in a reduction in emissions of nitrous oxide (a greenhouse gas) from agriculture. There is, however, strong opposition from some at the University of Auckland, and a few others, based on the risks of the dung beetles acting as vectors of disease. There are public health researchers at the University of Auckland who agree with the current EPA risk assessment  and there are several Landcare programmes in Australia that involve schoolchildren collecting dung beetles.

The African dung beetle (D. gazella) was introduced in several locations in North and South America and has been spreading its distribution to other regions by natural dispersal and accidental transportation, and is now probably naturalized in most countries between México and Argentina. The exotic species might be useful for controlling diseases of livestock in commercial areas, and might displace native species in modified landscapes; however, data is not conclusive about its effect on native species in natural environments and further monitoring is required.

Like many other insects, (dried) dung beetle, called qiāngláng (蜣蜋) in Chinese, is used in Chinese herbal medicine. It is recorded in the "Insect section" (蟲部) of the Compendium of Materia Medica, where it is recommended for the cure of 10 diseases.

In Isan, Northeastern Thailand, the local people eat many different kinds of insects, including the dung beetle. There is an Isan song กุดจี่หายไปใหน "Where Did the Dung Beetle Go", which relates the replacement of water buffalo with the "metal" buffalo, which does not provide the dung needed for the dung beetle and has led to the increasing rarity of the dung beetle in the agricultural region.

The Mediterranean dung beetle (Bubas bison) has been used in conjunction with biochar stock fodder to reduce emissions of nitrous oxide and carbon dioxide, which are both greenhouse gases. The beetles work the biochar-enriched dung into the soil without the use of machines.

In culture
Some dung beetles are used as food in South East Asia and a variety of dung beetle species have been used therapeutically (and are still being used in traditionally living societies) in potions and folk medicines to treat a number of illnesses and disorders.

Ancient Egypt

Several species of the dung beetle, most notably the species Scarabaeus sacer (often referred to as the sacred scarab), enjoyed a sacred status among the ancient Egyptians.
Egyptian hieroglyphic script uses the image of the beetle to represent a triliteral phonetic that Egyptologists transliterate as xpr or ḫpr and translate as "to come into being", "to become" or "to transform". The derivative term xprw or ḫpr(w) is variously translated as "form", "transformation", "happening", "mode of being" or "what has come into being", depending on the context. It may have existential, fictional, or ontologic significance.

The scarab was linked to Khepri ("he who has come into being"), the god of the rising sun. The ancients believed that the dung beetle was only male-sexed, and reproduced by depositing semen into a dung ball. The supposed self-creation of the beetle resembles that of Khepri, who creates himself out of nothing. Moreover, the dung ball rolled by a dung beetle resembles the sun. Plutarch wrote: 

The ancient Egyptians believed that Khepri renewed the sun every day before rolling it above the horizon, then carried it through the other world after sunset, only to renew it, again, the next day. Some New Kingdom royal tombs exhibit a threefold image of the sun god, with the beetle as symbol of the morning sun. The astronomical ceiling in the tomb of Ramses VI portrays the nightly "death" and "rebirth" of the sun as being swallowed by Nut, goddess of the sky, and re-emerging from her womb as Khepri.

The image of the scarab, conveying ideas of transformation, renewal, and resurrection, is ubiquitous in ancient Egyptian religious and funerary art.

Excavations of ancient Egyptian sites have yielded images of the scarab in bone, ivory, stone, Egyptian faience, and precious metals, dating from the Sixth Dynasty and up to the period of Roman rule. They are generally small, bored to allow stringing on a necklace, and the base bears a brief inscription or cartouche. Some have been used as seals. Pharaohs sometimes commissioned the manufacture of larger images with lengthy inscriptions, such as the commemorative scarab of Queen Tiye. Massive sculptures of scarabs can be seen at Luxor Temple, at the Serapeum in Alexandria (see Serapis) and elsewhere in Egypt.

The scarab was of prime significance in the funerary cult of ancient Egypt. Scarabs, generally, though not always, were cut from green stone, and placed on the chest of the deceased. Perhaps the most famous example of such "heart scarabs" is the yellow-green pectoral scarab found among the entombed provisions of Tutankhamen. It was carved from a large piece of Libyan desert glass. The purpose of the "heart scarab" was to ensure that the heart would not bear witness against the deceased at judgement in the Afterlife. Other possibilities are suggested by the "transformation spells" of the Coffin Texts, which affirm that the soul of the deceased may transform (xpr) into a human being, a god, or a bird and reappear in the world of the living.

One scholar comments on other traits of the scarab connected with the theme of death and rebirth:

In contrast to funerary contexts, some of ancient Egypt's neighbors adopted the scarab motif for seals of varying types. The best-known of these being Judean LMLK seals (8 of 21 designs contained scarab beetles), which were used exclusively to stamp impressions on storage jars during the reign of Hezekiah.

The scarab remains an item of popular interest thanks to modern fascination with the art and beliefs of ancient Egypt. Scarab beads in semiprecious stones or glazed ceramics can be purchased at most bead shops, while at Luxor Temple a massive ancient scarab has been roped off to discourage visitors from rubbing the base of the statue "for luck".

In literature
In Aesop's fable "The Eagle and the Beetle", the eagle kills a hare that has asked for sanctuary with a beetle. The beetle then takes revenge by twice destroying the eagle's eggs. The eagle, in despair, flies up to Olympus and places her latest eggs in Zeus's lap, beseeching the god to protect them. When the beetle finds out what the eagle has done, it stuffs itself with dung, goes straight up to Zeus and flies right into his face. Zeus is startled at the sight of the unpleasant creature, jumping to his feet so that the eggs are broken. Learning of the origin of their feud, Zeus attempts to mediate and, when his efforts to mediate fail, he changes the breeding season of the eagle to a time when the beetles are not above ground.

Aristophanes alluded to Aesop's fable several times in his plays. In Peace, the hero rides up to Olympus to free the goddess Peace from her prison. His steed is an enormous dung beetle which has been fed so much dung that it has grown to monstrous size.

Hans Christian Andersen's "The Dung Beetle" tells the story of a dung beetle who lives in the stable of the king's horses in an imaginary kingdom. When he demands golden shoes like those the king's horse wears and is refused, he flies away and has a series of adventures, which are often precipitated by his feeling of superiority to other animals. He finally returns to the stable having decided (against all logic) that it is for him that the king's horse wears golden shoes.

In Franz Kafka's The Metamorphosis, the transformed character of Gregor Samsa is called an "old dung beetle" (alter Mistkäfer) by a charwoman.

See also

 Catharsius, an important dung beetle genus in African and Asian environments
 Addo Elephant National Park, site of the largest remaining population of the endangered flightless dung beetle (Circellium bacchus).
 List of dung beetle and chafer (Scarabaeoidea) species recorded in Britain
 Rotating locomotion in living systems

References

Book sources

External links

 Feature: 'What to do with too much poo' – The success story behind the introduction of dung beetles in Australia at cosmosmagazine.com
 Beetles as religious symbols at insects.org
 Scarabaeinae Research Network 
 Dung beetles at the Australia Museum
 Catharsius, an international group working on taxonomy and ecology of Western African dung beetles
 Tomas Libich, Congo dung beetle sp1 and Congo dung beetle sp2 photos
 Dung Beetles in action (video) by The WILD Foundation/Boyd Norton
 Dung Beetles in New Zealand (proposed release of dung beetles, with background research)
 Marcus Byrne The dance of the dung beetle Ted conference about dung beetle behavior.
 Dung Beetle Ecosystem Engineers Dung Beetle Ecosystem Engineers – expanding the range of dung beetles in Australia and analysing their performance for livestock producers.

Coprophagous insects

Scarabaeidae
Articles containing video clips
Polyphyletic groups
Insect common names